This article displays the rosters for the participating teams at the 1993 Tournament of the Americas played in San Juan, Puerto Rico from August 28 to September 5, 1993.

Group A

Brazil

4 Chuí
5 Ratto
6 Olívia
7 Pipoka
8 Ferreira
9 Demétrius
10 Maury
11 Minuci
12 Josuel
13 Janjão
14 Rogério
15 Luizão
Head coach:  Ênio Ângelo Vecchi

Dominican Republic

4 Derek Baker
5 Víctor Hansen
6 Evaristo Pérez Carrión
7 José Molina
8 Víctor Chacón
9 José Mercedes
10 Mario Regús
11 Vinicio Muñoz
12 Tito Horford
13 Felipe López
14 Mauricio Espinal
15 José Vargas
Head coach:  Héctor Báez

Panama

4 Anthony Fiss
5 Ricardo Yearwood
6 Ricardo Grant
7 Eliécer Ellis Jr.
8 Guillermo Myers
9 Leroy Jackson
10 Mario Gálvez
11 Rolando Frazer
12 Amado Martínez
13 Carlos Rockshead
14 Rubén Garcés
15 Mario Butler
Head coach:  Flor Meléndez

United States

4 Tony White
5 Kelsey Weems
6 Craig Neal
7 Eldridge Recasner
8 Rod Mason
9 Reggie Jordan
10 Harold Ellis
11 Chris Jent
12 Tony Martin
13 Brian Rahilly
14 Bobby Martin
15 Tom Copa
Head coach:  Mike Thibault

Venezuela

4 Víctor David Díaz
5 César Portillo
6 Armando Becker
7 Nelson Solórzano
8 Rostyn González
9 Eduardo Crespo
10 Sam Shepherd
11 Richard Medina
12 Víctor González
13 Gabriel Estaba
14 Iván Olivares
15 Omar Walcott
Head coach:  Julio Toro

Group B

Argentina

4 Eduardo Dominé
5 Fabián Tourn
6 Luis Villar
7 Daniel Farabello
8 Carlos Romano
9 Marcelo Milanesio
10 Juan Espil
11 Diego Osella
12 Sebastián Uranga
13 Hernán Montenegro
14 Esteban Pérez
15 Rubén Wolkowyski
Head coach:  Guillermo Vecchio

Canada

4 Joey Vickery
5 Ronn McMahon
6 Steve Nash
7 David Turcotte
8 Rowan Barrett
9 Cordell Llewellyn
10 Kory Hallas
11 Dwight Walton
12 William Njoku
13 Jeff Foreman
14 Rob Wilson
15 Sean VanKoughnett
Head coach:  Ken Shields

Cuba

4 Ángel Caballero
5 Yudith Abreu
6 Roberto Amaro
7 Ángel Núñez
8 José Luis Díaz
9 Roberto Herrera García
10 Leonardo Pérez
11 Lazaro Borrell
12 Luciano Rivero
13 Pedro Cobarrubias
14 Richard Matienzo
15 Andrés Guibert
Head coach:  Miguel Calderón Gómez

Puerto Rico

4 José Ortiz
5 Federico López
6 Dean Borges
7 Luis Allende
8 Jerome Mincy
9 James Carter
10 Javier Antonio Colón
11 Julián Rodríguez
12 Mario Morales
13 Edgar de León
14 Eddie Casiano
15 Félix Javier Pérez
Head coach:  Carlos Morales

Uruguay

4 Horacio López
5 Camilo Acosta
6 Luis Pierri
7 Julio Pereyra
8 Alain Mayor
9 Juliano Rivera
10 Marcelo Capalbo
11 Diego Losada
12 Gustavo Szczygielski
13 Adrián Laborda
14 Enrique Tucuna
15 Federico Garcín
Head coach:  Víctor Hugo Berardi

Bibliography

External links
1993 FIBA Americas Champioship for Men at fiba.basketball

FIBA AmeriCup squads